The 2020 United States House of Representatives elections in Iowa was held on November 3, 2020, to elect the four U.S. representatives from the state of Iowa, one from each of the state's four congressional districts. The elections coincided with the 2020 U.S. presidential election, as well as other elections to the House of Representatives, elections to the United States Senate and various state and local elections.

Overview

By district

District 1

The 1st district is based in northeastern Iowa, and includes the cities of Dubuque, Cedar Rapids and Waterloo. The incumbent was Democrat Abby Finkenauer, who flipped the district and was elected with 51.0% of the vote in 2018.

Democratic primary

Candidates

Nominee
Abby Finkenauer, incumbent U.S. Representative

Endorsements

Results

Republican primary

Candidates

Nominee
Ashley Hinson, state representative

Defeated in primary
Thomas Hansen, farmer and businessman

Declined
Rod Blum, former U.S. Representative

Endorsements

Results

General election

Predictions

Polling

Generic Democrat vs Generic Republican

Results

District 2

The 2nd district encompasses southeastern Iowa, and is home to the cities of Davenport, Iowa City, Muscatine, Clinton, Burlington, Ottumwa, Fort Madison, Oskaloosa, Bettendorf, Newton and Pella. The incumbent was Democrat Dave Loebsack, who was re-elected with 54.8% of the vote in 2018. On April 12, 2019, he announced that he would not seek re-election.

Democratic primary

Candidates

Nominee
Rita Hart, former state senator and nominee for Lieutenant Governor of Iowa in 2018

Withdrawn
Newman Abuissa, engineer

Declined
Ken Croken, member of the Scott County Board of Supervisors
Cathy Glasson, union leader, nurse, and candidate for Governor of Iowa in 2018
Kevin Kinney, state senator
Dave Loebsack, incumbent U.S. Representative
Ian Russell, attorney
Veronica Tessler, businesswoman
Zach Wahls, state senator

Endorsements

Results

Republican primary

Candidates

Nominee
Mariannette Miller-Meeks, state senator; nominee for this seat in 2008, 2010, and 2014

Defeated in primary
 Tim Borchardt, retail worker
 Steven Everly, electrician
 Rick Phillips, businessman
Bobby Schilling, former U.S. Representative from Illinois's 17th congressional district (2011–2013)

Withdrawn
Thomas Kedley, mayor of Osceola

Declined
Chris Cournoyer, state senator
Bob Gallagher, mayor of Bettendorf
Bobby Kaufmann, state representative
Barbara Kniff-McCulla, CEO of KLK Construction and member of the National Women's Business Council
Mark Lofgren, state senator
Chris Peters, surgeon and nominee for Iowa's 2nd congressional district in 2016 and 2018
Brad Randolph, mayor of Fort Madison
Roby Smith, state senator

Endorsements

Results

General election

Predictions

Polling

with Generic Democrat and Generic Republican

Results

Republican Mariannette Miller-Meeks was state-certified as the winner over Democrat Rita Hart on November 30 by an extremely narrow margin of 6 votes. On December 2, Hart announced that she would contest the election with the House Administration Committee under the 1969 Federal Contested Elections Act. On December 30, House Speaker Nancy Pelosi announced Miller-Meeks would be seated provisionally on January 3, 2021 with the rest of the incoming new Congress members. Republicans sharply criticized Pelosi's decision to review the race in the House Administration Committee, calling it an attempt to steal the election. It was also criticized by moderate Democrats, who argued it was hypocritical to overturn a certified state election after criticizing attempts to overturn the results of the 2020 presidential election. Hart withdrew her challenge on March 31, 2021.

District 3

The 3rd district encompasses southwestern Iowa, stretching from Des Moines to the state's borders with Nebraska and Missouri. The incumbent is Democrat Cindy Axne, who flipped the district and was elected with 49.3% of the vote in 2018.

Democratic primary

Candidates

Nominee
Cindy Axne, incumbent U.S. Representative

Results

Republican primary

Candidates

Nominee
David Young, former U.S. Representative

Defeated in primary
Bill Schafer, U.S. Army veteran

Declined
Jon Jacobsen, state representative
Zach Nunn, state senator
Brad Zaun, state senator

Results

Third parties

Candidates
Bryan Jack Holder (Libertarian)

General election

Predictions

Polling

with Generic Democrat and Generic Republican

Results

District 4

The 4th district is based in northwestern Iowa, including Sioux City, Ames, Mason City, Fort Dodge, Boone and Carroll. The incumbent was Republican Steve King, who had been re-elected with 50.3% of the vote in 2018.

Republican primary

Candidates

Nominee
Randy Feenstra, state senator

Defeated in primary
Steve King, incumbent U.S. Representative
Steve Reeder, businessman
Bret Richards, U.S. Army veteran and former businessman
Jeremy Taylor, Woodbury County supervisor and former state representative

Declined
Rick Bertrand, state senator and candidate for Iowa's 4th congressional district in 2016
Cyndi Hanson, candidate for Iowa's 4th congressional district in 2018
Chris McGowan, president of the Siouxland Chamber of Commerce
Rick Sanders, Story County supervisor
 Linda Upmeyer, Speaker of the Iowa House of Representatives

Endorsements

Polling

Results

Democratic primary

Candidates

Nominee
J. D. Scholten, former paralegal, former professional baseball player, and nominee for Iowa's 4th congressional district in 2018

Endorsements

Results

General election

Predictions

Polling

with Steve King and J.D. Scholten

with Steve King and Generic Democrat

with Generic Republican and Generic Democrat

Results

See also
 2020 Iowa elections

Notes

Partisan clients

References

External links
  (State affiliate of the U.S. League of Women Voters)
 

Official campaign websites for 1st district candidates
 Abby Finkenauer (D) for Congress
 Ashley Hinson (R) for Congress

Official campaign websites for 2nd district candidates
 Rita Hart (D) for Congress
 Mariannette Miller-Meeks (R) for Congress

Official campaign websites for 3rd district candidates
 Cindy Axne (D) for Congress
 David Young (R) for Congress 

Official campaign websites for 4th district candidates
 Randy Feenstra (R) for Congress
 J. D. Scholten (D) for Congress

Iowa
2020
United States House of Representatives